Dash Berlin is a Dutch electronic music duo started in 2007 in The Hague by Eelke Kalberg and Sebastiaan Molijn. Dash Berlin were voted the seventh most popular DJs in the world according to DJ Mag in 2012; Kalberg and Molijn were record producers. Kalberg and Molijn left the group in 2019 and returned in 2021 after winning a legal dispute against Jeffrey Sutorius over the "Dash Berlin" trademark.

Kalberg and Molijn have been contributing to the international dance scene for over twenty years, with award-winning and platinum-selling hits for dance acts such as Alice Deejay, Vengaboys, Candee Jay, Pronti and Kalmani and Solid Sessions. Their track "Better Off Alone" was one of the first trance records that became big in the U.S. and was later sampled by French superstar DJ David Guetta in his song "Play Hard" and one of America's biggest rappers Wiz Khalifa in his breakthrough record "Say Yeah". They also had worked together with DJ Sander Kleinenberg on classic tracks like "This Is Miami" and "The Fruit" and remixes for major artists such as Justin Timberlake ('Rock Your Body' Remix winning the award for 'Best Remix' at the Dance Star USA Awards), Janet Jackson, BT, Usher, N.E.R.D., Lenny Kravitz, Junkie XL, Röyksopp, Mylo and Annie Lennox.

On 18 June 2018, Sutorius announced his split from Dash Berlin while severing ties with Kalberg and Molijn, alleging mismanagement and career neglect issues. Beginning October 2018, Sutorius has been  performing and releasing songs credited under his own name, while Dash Berlin continued as a duo. Sutorius later gained Legal ownership of the name on 21 June 2019 while Kalberg and Molijn were forced out from Dash Berlin to pursue their own musical projects.

On 29 March 2021, Sutorius announced on his Facebook page that he would onwards perform, produce and release music under his own name "Jeffrey Sutorius". The announcement came after he had lost a legal dispute with the former members of the group who has since 17 March 2021 been the legal owners of the Dash Berlin trademark.

History

Formation
Dash Berlin was formed by Kalberg and Molijn in The Hague, Netherlands, with Sutorius joining soon after. Jeffrey Sutorius was a fan of electronic music from his high school days and in his late teens worked in a record store and became a collector of vinyl trance music. Inspired by pioneering figures such as Sven Väth, Oliver Lieb and Sander Kleinenberg, Sutorius began mixing and producing his own music. He released his first record on 'BPM Legends' records. He started performing in the Dutch underground music scene in early '95 and teamed up with fellow producers and close friends Kalberg and Molijn to form Dash Berlin into a trio in 2006.

Sutorius' split from group and eventual return
On 18 June 2018, Jeffrey Sutorius announced through a press statement that he would be leaving the group, while cutting his connections with Kalberg, Molijn, and the Vanderkleij Agency. He revealed that Molijn and Kalberg had registered the name "Dash Berlin" under their own names while leaving him out, thus leaving him legally unable to perform as Dash Berlin. Further attempts to reconcile through lawyers and courts had failed, and Sutorius was also blocked from accessing the group's social media accounts after severing ties with his former partners. Sutorius later announced that he would be producing and performing under his own name, beginning October 2018.

In a second press statement with DJ Mag, Sutorius revealed that his intense touring periods had brought up health issues for him in late-2017, which in turn led him to take two months off for a physical checkup. During that time period, Sutorius was unable to perform, to his management's heavy opposition. He eventually stopped working with his booking company, while Kalberg and Molijn froze Sutorius out of Dash Berlin's social media accounts and filed a court claim against him for failure to fulfil his booked shows. The court later denied the claim. Kalberg and Molijn's reasons for registering the Dash Berlin name without Sutorius are still unclear due to their refusal to provide documents and information to Sutorius.

On 21 June 2019, Dash Berlin released an official statement which announced the departure of Kalberg and Molijn from the group, leaving behind Sutorius to lead the group as a solo artist. The group concluded that the "chemistry between [Dash Berlin] is gone and that it is time for a change", with the former producers focusing on new musical projects.

Recognition
The breakthrough for Dash Berlin came in early 2007 with "Till the Sky Falls Down". The track went to the top of the trance charts worldwide, due in part to Armin van Buuren who included it on the third chapter of his acclaimed Universal Religion mix album. Van Buuren subsequently signed Dash Berlin to the Armada Music label.

Dash Berlin won the IDMA award for the track "Waiting" in the category 'Best High Energy Track' and was nominated three times at the International Dance Music Awards, during the WMC in Miami in 2009. His tracks "Waiting" featuring Australian singer Emma Hewitt and "Man On The Run", a collaboration with fellow Armada artists Cerf, Mitiska and Jaren were both nominated that year in the category 'Best Trance Track'. In Armin van Buuren's popular radio show A State of Trance the "Waiting" single was elected by the audience to the second best trance track of the year 2009. The music video is shot in Rotterdam and gained over twenty-five million views on YouTube.

In 2010, Dash were nominated for the "Best European DJ" at the IDMA's and entered the DJ Mag Top 100 poll at number 15. They won the DJ Mag Top 100 Award for "Highest New Entry", during the Magazine's ceremony at the Ministry Of Sound in London, hosted by Boy George. Beating other famous Dutch DJs such as Armin van Buuren, Tiesto, Ferry Corsten as the highest Dutch entry to date. On 20 October 2011, DJ Magazine announced the results of their annual Top 100 DJ Poll for the very first time in Amsterdam, with Dash Berlin placed at number eight in the world. In 2012, Dash Berlin receives a nomination for "Best Trance Track" at the IDMA's for his track with Jonathan Mendelsohn entitled "Better Half Of Me". October 2012: In Mexico Dash Berlin are nominated for a prestigious Lunas Award in the category Electronic Music among other artists such as Armin van Buuren, Paul van Dyk, and David Guetta, among others. Later that month, Dash were ranked number 7 in the DJ Mag Top 100 poll, making them the second most popular Trance DJ in the world, right after their mentor Armin van Buuren. In December 2012, Dash Berlin were nominated for a 'Tunisia Music Award', Africa's biggest award show to date. Also in December, Dash Berlin headlined the Sunset Music Festival in Sri Lanka for the first time. In February 2013, Dash Berlin headlined Ultra Chile and Ultra Buenos Aires with Avicii, Carl Cox and Armin van Buuren. In 2013, Dash Berlin received a nomination for the "Best Trance Track" at the IDMA awards for their single "When You Were Around" featuring British singer Kate Walsh.

Dash Berlin was the first DJ to be announced for Armin van Buuren's A State Of Trance 600 event in 2013. Dash played at ASOT Den Bosch, ASOT Mexico City, ASOT Minsk, ASOT Sofia, ASOT Beirut, and ASOT Guatemala.

In 2014, Dash Berlin were nominated for the 2014 Ibiza DJ Award, but lost out to Iban Mendoza.

Aropa Records
In early 2009, plans emerged to expand the Dash Berlin influence with their own label called Aropa Records. The first release under the new label is "Man on the Run", a collaboration with fellow Armada artists Cerf, Mitiska and Jaren. The track rocketed to the top of the international trance charts and received a nomination for 'Best Trance Track' at the annual Trance Awards. The song is also the lead single of their debut album The New Daylight which was released later that year in October. In April 2012, Dash Berlin released their second artist album on Aropa and Armada Music titled #Musicislife.

Discography

Studio albums

Singles

Remixes
 2004: Motorcycle — "As the Rush Comes" (Dash Berlin Remix)
 2008: Cerf, Mitiska and Jaren — "You Never Said" (Dash Berlin Remix)
 2009: Medina — "You & I" (Dash Berlin Remix)
 2009: Depeche Mode — "Peace" (Dash Berlin Remix)
 2010: Armin van Buuren vs. Sophie Ellis-Bextor — "Not Giving Up On Love" (Dash Berlin 4AM Mix)
 2011: Filo & Peri featuring Audrey Gallagher — "This Night" (Dash Berlin Remix)
 2011: First State featuring Sarah Howells — "Reverie" (Dash Berlin Remix)
 2011: Lange pres. Firewall — "Touched" (Dash Berlin's 'Sense Of Touch' Remix)
 2012: Ferry Corsten featuring Betsie Larkin — "Not Coming Down" (Dash Berlin 4AM Remix)
2012: Alesso featuring Matthew Koma — "Years" (Dash Berlin Remix)
 2013: OneRepublic — "If I Lose Myself" (Dash Berlin Remix)
 2013: Hardwell featuring Amba Shepherd — "Apollo" (Dash Berlin 4AM Remix)
 2013: Krewella — "Live For The Night" (Dash Berlin Remix)
 2014: Zedd featuring Matthew Koma and Miriam Bryant — "Find You" (Dash Berlin Remix)
 2014: Cash Cash featuring John Rzeznik — "Lightning" (Dash Berlin 4AM Remix)
 2015: Lost Frequencies — "Are You With Me" (Dash Berlin Remix)
 2015: Calvin Harris featuring Ellie Goulding — "Outside" (Dash Berlin Ultra Miami Rework)
 2015: Dash Berlin featuring Emma Hewitt — "Waiting" (Dash Berlin 2015 Miami Remix)
 2016: Alan Walker featuring Iselin Solheim — "Faded" (Dash Berlin Remix)
2016: Alesso featuring Matthew Koma — "Years" (Dash Berlin Remix) (2016 version)
 2016: Maroon 5 featuring Kendrick Lamar — "Don't Wanna Know" (Dash Berlin Rework)
 2016: Adam Lambert — "Ghost Town" (Dash Berlin Remix)
 2017: Clean Bandit featuring Zara Larsson — "Symphony" (Dash Berlin Remix)
 2017: Zara Larsson — "I Would Like" (Dash Berlin Remix)
 2017: Gareth Emery featuring Christina Novelli — "Concrete Angel" (Dash Berlin Remix)
 2018: Lost Frequencies and Zonderling — "Crazy" (Dash Berlin Remix)
 2019: San Holo — "Lost Lately" (Dash Berlin Remix)
 2021: Linkin Park — "In the End" (Dash Berlin 4AM Remix)
 2022: Dash Berlin featuring Emma Hewitt — "Waiting" (Ultra Edit)
 2022: Dash Berlin featuring Jonathan Mendelsohn — "Better Half of Me" (Ultra Edit)

Jeffrey Sutorius Discography formerly miscredited to Dash Berlin

This is a list of songs released under the Dash Berlin name under the period from when control of the band's name was legally owned by former live member Jeffery Sutorius in 2019, and when founding members Eelke and Sebastiaan won the legal battle to regain ownership of their band.

Singles

Remixes

 2019: Myon featuring Icon — "Cold Summer" (Dash Berlin Remix)
 2019: Marco V — "Come Back Home" (Dash Berlin Remix)
 2019: Gattüso and Damon Sharpe — "When In Rome" (Dash Berlin Remix)
 2019: Laidback Luke and Marc Benjamin — "We're Forever" (Dash Berlin Remix)
 2020: Sam Feldt featuring Sigma and Gia Koka — "2 Hearts" (Dash Berlin Remix)
 2020: Nicky Romero — "Stay" (Dash Berlin Remix)
 2020: Steve Aoki featuring Kita Sovee and Julien Marchal — "Closer To God" (Dash Berlin Remix)
 2020: Gattüso featuring Kat Nestel — "Walk on Water" (Dash Berlin Remix)
 2020: Darius & Finlay — "Clothes Off (Nanana)" (Dash Berlin Remix)

References

External links
 

Dutch electronic music groups
Dutch DJs
Dutch musical duos
Electronic dance music duos
Revealed Recordings artists